The Embranchement de Colmar is a canal in eastern France.  It connects Colmar to the Rhine at Biesheim.  It is 23 km long with three locks.

See also
List of canals in France

References

Colmar